Naradhiwas Rajanagarindra Road is a road in central Bangkok. It is a main transport route in the area of Bang Rak, Sathon and Yan Nawa districts. Starting from Surawong road in Suriyawong sub-district, Bang Rak district and heading southeast parallel to Khlong Chong Nonsi (Chong Nonsi canal), then cut with Si Lom road in the Si Lom sub-district, Bang Rak district, then cut with Sathon road in the area of Sathon district. The road in this portion is a boundary line between Thung Maha Mek and Yan Nawa sub-districts of Sathon district. Therefrom cut with Chan road in the area of Chong Nonsi sub-district, Yan Nawa district and cut with Ratchadaphisek road until end of convergence with Rama III road at Rama III - Naradhiwas junction or Chong Nonsi junction.

Its name in honour of Princess Galyani Vadhana, Princess of Naradhiwas who was the elder sister of King Ananda Mahidol (Rama VIII) and King Bhumibol Adulyadej (Rama IX). At first it was built it has no official name, later on it was given the name from King Bhumibol Adulyadej in 1996.

Places of  interest
Rajamangala University of Technology Krungthep
Siam Makro Sathon
Chong Nonsi BTS station
Tesco Lotus Rama III
Wat Pho Maen Khunaram
MahaNakhon

References 

Streets in Bangkok
Bang Rak district
Sathon district
Yan Nawa district